White Brook is a tributary of Mehoopany Creek in Wyoming County, Pennsylvania, in the United States. The stream is classified as a High-Quality Coldwater Fishery. It has a small waterfall and a hiking path is located nearby.

Course

White Brook begins near the edge of a plateau in North Branch Township. It flows south-southwest for a few tenths of a mile, heading into a valley. The stream then turns south-southeast for several tenths of a mile before entering Forkston Township and reaching the valley floor, where it receives an unnamed tributary from the right. It then turns east-southeast for several tenths of a mile before turning east-northeast for several tenths of a mile and exiting the valley. Here, the stream flows east for several tenths of a mile in the Mehoopany Creek valley before reaching its confluence with Mehoopany Creek.

Geography and geology

There is a waterfall on White Brook. However, it is only accessible by bushwhacking.

One person has received an encroachment permit to build and maintain a  private footbridge across White Brook near State Route 3001.

Watershed and biology
The mouth of the stream is in the United States Geological Survey quadrangle of Dutch Mountain. However, its source is in the quadrangle of Jenningsville. The stream's mouth is located near Kasson Brook. There are a few cottages along the lower reaches of the stream.

White Brook is classified as a High-Quality Coldwater Fishery. Wild trout naturally reproduce in the stream from its headwaters downstream to its mouth.

History and recreation
White Brook was entered into the Geographic Names Information System on August 2, 1979. Its identifier in the Geographic Names Information System is 1199780.

Since 2000, a streambank stabilization project has been done on White Brook.

White Brook is in Pennsylvania State Game Lands Number 57. An old, unmarked steep trail follows the stream up to a "beautiful" vista at Flat Top. Some all-terrain vehicle trails are present in the upper reaches of the stream's watershed. These are maintained via flagging and removal of brush and trees.

See also
Bowman Hollow, next tributary of Mehoopany Creek going downstream
Scouten Brook, next tributary of Mehoopany Creek going upstream
List of rivers of Pennsylvania

References

Tributaries of Mehoopany Creek